The 1812 United States presidential election in Massachusetts took place between November 1 and 3, 1812, as part of the 1812 United States presidential election. Voters chose 19 representatives, or electors to the Electoral College, who voted for President and Vice President.

During this election, both candidates technically ran as Democratic-Republicans as the Federalist Party chose not to field a candidate nationally. While DeWitt Clinton won all 19 Massachusetts state electors by a wide margin of 30.02%, he lost the general election to the incumbent president James Madison.

Results

See also
 United States presidential elections in Massachusetts

Notes

References

Massachusetts
1812
1812 Massachusetts elections